The second HMS Wivern (D66, later I66), was a Modified W-class destroyer of the British Royal Navy that saw service in World War II.

Building and commissioning
Wivern was ordered in April 1918 as part of the 13th Order of the 1917-1918 Naval Programme. She was laid down on 19 August 1918 by J. Samuel White at Cowes, Isle of Wight, and launched on 16 April 1919. She was completed on 23 December 1919 and was commissioned into service the same day with the pennant number D66.

Service history

Before World War II
After entering service with the fleet in 1919, Wivern was assigned to the 3rd Destroyer Flotilla, serving with that flotilla in the Atlantic Fleet and Mediterranean Fleet before being decommissioned, transferred to the Reserve Fleet, and placed in reserve.

In 1939, Wivern was recommissioned as the fleet mobilised because of deteriorating diplomatic relations between the United Kingdom and Nazi Germany and was selected for assignment to the 16th Destroyer Flotilla based at Portsmouth in the event of war breaking out.

World War II

1939
After the United Kingdom entered World War II on 3 September 1939, Wiverns assignment at Portsmouth was cancelled, and instead she was assigned to Western Approaches Command for convoy defence operations in the Western Approaches.

In October 1939, Wivern was transferred to the 16th Destroyer Flotilla under Commander-in-Chief, The Nore at Harwich for convoy escort and patrol duty in the North Sea.

Wivern continued her North Sea operations without further major incident through the end of 1939 and into 1940.

1940
Wivern remained on convoy and patrol duty in the North Sea until May 1940, the month in which her pennant number was changed to I66. On 10 May, as the German invasion of the Netherlands, Belgium, Luxembourg, and France began, she was ordered to join the destroyer  in Operation XD, consisting of demolition operations at Hook of Holland to prevent German forces from capturing important installations there intact. Accordingly, Wivern and Wild Swan went to Hook of Holland on 11 May, where Wivern took aboard the British diplomatic mission to the Netherlands for passage to Vlissingen. On 13 May, Wivern took part in Operation Ordnance, the evacuation of Allied personnel from Hook of Holland as German ground forces advanced through the Netherlands, suffering damage on 14 May during the operation. She then entered a dockyard in the United Kingdom for repairs.

After completion of repairs, Wivern returned to service with her flotilla at Harwich in July 1940 to continue her convoy and patrol duties in the North Sea. On 11 July 1940 she was attacked by German aircraft off Suffolk while escorting Convoy FN 19 near Aldeburgh Light, but she avoided damage by manoeuvering. On 7 September 1940 Wivern and Wild Swan took part in Operation Rival, screening Cardiff and the light cruiser  as they patrolled off the coast of the Netherlands.

After Operation Rival, Wivern was transferred to Western Approaches Command with Wild Swan, the destroyer leader , and the destroyer  to serve in the 5th Escort Group, based at Liverpool, for convoy escort work in the North Atlantic Ocean. She carried out these duties for the rest of 1940 without major incident.

1941
Wivern remained on convoy escort duty in the North Atlantic through the early weeks of 1941. On 26 February 1941, she deployed to escort ships of the 20th Destroyer Flotilla during Operation JH, a minelaying operation in the English Channel off Cape D'Antifer, France. She returned to her convoy duties after the conclusion of the operation.

In May 1941, Wivern, Wild Swan, and the destroyer  deployed to Portsmouth. On 12 May, Wivern, Wild Swan, and the escort destroyers  and  escorted the heavy cruiser , which was undergoing a refit, and was moved from Portsmouth to Rosyth, Scotland, to avoid German air raids. On 14 May Wivern and Wild Swan escorted the Free French Forces  on the first leg of Surcoufs transatlantic voyage, separating from the submarine to return to the United Kingdom on reaching .

Wivern instead was retained for duty in the Western Approaches pending developments related to the hunt for Bismarck and took passage with Vansittart and Wild Swan to Portsmouth to await further orders. Heavy units of the Home Fleet sank Bismarck in the North Atlantic on 27 May, and on 30 May the three destroyers returned to the Clyde. On 3 June 1941, Wivern and the other ships of the local escort detached from WS 8X to return to the Clyde, leaving the convoy's protection to its ocean escort, which consisted of the aircraft carrier , the heavy cruiser , the light cruiser , and the armed merchant cruiser .

On 18 June 1941, Wivern once again was assigned to convoy escort duty at Freetown along with Vansittart and Wild Swan, and the three destroyers steamed there that month to report for duty. From 10 to 13 July 1941, Wivern, Wild Swan, the destroyer , and the corvette  reinforced the ocean escort – made up of the light cruiser  and armed merchant cruiser  – of the military convoy WS 9B during the final leg of its voyage to Freetown.

On 3 August 1941, Wivern departed Freetown bound for Gibraltar, where she entered the Royal Navy Dockyard for a refit. Upon its completion in September 1941, she was based at Gibraltar for Atlantic convoy escort operations, which she continued for the rest of 1941 without major incident.

1942
Upon arriving at Freetown, she continued convoy escort duty based there.

In March 1942, the civil community of West Hartlepool in County Durham "adopted" Wivern in a Warship Week national savings campaign. On 3 May 1942, she departed Freetown with Boreas, the heavy cruiser , the light cruiser , the seaplane carrier , the escort destroyer , and the Royal Netherlands Navy destroyer  as the escort for Convoy WS 18, detaching with Boreas on 4 May to return to Freetown. On 30 June 1942, Wivern, Boreas, and the destroyer  joined Convoy WS 20 at sea to reinforce its escort – consisting of Brilliant, the destroyer , and the escort destroyer  – and remained with the convoy until it arrived at Freetown on 2 July 1942.

Wivern remained on escort duty at Freetown until October 1942, when she proceeded to Gibraltar with orders to support Operation Torch, the upcoming Allied amphibious landings in French Morocco and French Algeria scheduled for November 1942.

Wivern continued on convoy escort duty based at Gibraltar through the end of 1942 and into 1943.

1943
While rescuing Weyburns survivors, Wivern suffered severe structural damage either from the detonation of another mine or when depth charges aboard Weyburn exploded as she sank.

In March 1943, Wivern was towed to the United Kingdom for repairs, and in April 1943 she was decommissioned at Plymouth and entered the Royal Navy Dockyard there for extensive repairs – including to her propulsion plant, which the explosion had lifted off its mountings – and a refit that included the replacement of her forward 4.7-inch (120-mm) with a twin 6-pounder British Army gun for use against motor torpedo boats. She was in dockyard hands for the next 20 months.

1944-1945
With her repairs and refit finally complete, Wivern underwent post-refit acceptance trials in September 1944 and recommissioned that month for assignment back to the Nore for service with the Harwich Escort Force. In October 1944, she took up her duties at Harwich, which were focused on nightly patrols to counter the operations of German motor torpedo boats – S-boats, known to the Allies as "E-boats" – in the North Sea. In November 1944, she began escort duty for North Sea convoys during their voyages between the Thames Estuary and Rosyth.

In January 1945, Wivern was escorting a convoy when she suffered structural damage during a Force 12 gale. She underwent repairs at the Royal Navy Dockyard at Rosyth and returned to duty in February 1945.

Wivern was part of the escort of Convoy FS 56 on its voyage from Rosyth to the Thames Estuary on 14 March 1945 when the  attacked, torpedoing and sinking the Danish cargo ship Magne off St. Abbs, Scotland, near the Firth of Forth. As Wivern rescued Magnes survivors, the South African Navy frigate , a new ship that had left the River Tyne only four hours earlier bound for Scapa Flow in the Orkney Islands and then for antisubmarine warfare training at Tobermory on the Isle of Mull, arrived on the scene to assist. Natal detected a submerged submarine with her ASDIC equipment, which was more modern and advanced than that on Wivern. Natal attacked, firing two Squid anti-submarine mortar salvos of six depth bombs each. Natal then proceeded to Scapa Flow.

A Royal Navy antisubmarine hunter-killer group led by the frigate  arrived and depth-charged the position, bringing more flotsam from the submarine to the surface. Wivern, however, claimed a share of the kill after depth-charging an oil slick  to the south under the assumption that it was oil from U-714, which Wiverns crew believed had been only been damaged by Natal and was attempting to escape. Although some controversy surrounds credit for the sinking, naval authorities determined that Natal had sunk U-714 with the loss of the submarine's entire crew of 50 men and gave Natal sole credit.

Wivern continued her convoy escort duties in the North Sea until the surrender of Germany in early May 1945. She then deployed to support Allied reoccupation forces in Norway and to transport Allied personnel.

Decommissioning and disposal
Wivern was decommissioned and laid up at Rosyth later in the summer of 1945, and by October 1945 she no longer appeared on the Royal Navys active list. Later placed on the disposal list, she was sold to Metal Industries on 18 February 1947 for scrapping. She was towed to the breaker's yard at Charlestown, Fife, Scotland, in October 1948.

Notes

Bibliography
 
 
 
 
 
 
 
 
 
 
 
 
 
 

 

1919 ships
Ships built on the Isle of Wight
V and W-class destroyers of the Royal Navy
World War II destroyers of the United Kingdom